SlideShow was an Australian light entertainment game show television series hosted by Grant Denyer, which first screened on the Seven Network on 7 August 2013.

SlideShow was based on a French program Vendredi Tout est Permis Avec Arthur. Two teams of three celebrities competed in a number of challenges and parlour games, including one on a huge set that slides. The weekly team captains were Cal Wilson and Toby Truslove.

In February 2014, the show was officially cancelled after not being renewed for a second season.

Episodes

Games

Slide on Over
The showpiece game takes place inside a sliding room set at a 22.5 degree angle. Each team acts out an improvised scene (with the occasional prompt from host Denyer) while also negotiating the steep incline.

Photo Mime
One team-member looks at a screen and mimes out the image projected for their team members to guess. The image may be anything from an object to a well-known personality.

Trapezier Said Than Done
One team member suspended from the roof by a harness acts out common expressions for their teammates to guess – all while being lifted higher and higher off the floor.

ABC Story
All three team members act out a scene where every new line must start with the next letter of the alphabet. The first sentence starts with "A", the next with "B" and so forth until the scene ends with a sentence starting with "Z".

Shadow Puppets
Two team members are placed behind a shadow screen with props to mime out a movie title for their third team member to guess.

Danswers
One team member tries to get their teammates to guess a word – all while being twirled around by professional dancers. Includes cameos from Dancing with the Stars' Carmelo Pizzino and Jessica Raffa.

Alpha Body
This game involves two team members lying on the floor and contorting their bodies in unison to create letters individually to spell out a word. This can be seen from an overhead camera to make sure performers spell correctly.

Drawn Out
One team member sketches while the other team members guess what they're drawing.

Just Say It
One team member must get the other to guess certain words by explaining them, without saying the specific word – while the two act out a scene together.

Release
Shine International's parent company represents the format internationally, and apart from the Australian and French versions, local-language versions of the show have screened in Thailand, Finland, Portugal, Denmark, Spain, Brazil, Ukraine, Romania and Vietnam

International versions
The international rights are produced by Satisfaction – The Television Agency and distributed by Endemol Shine Group.

References

External links 
 

Seven Network original programming
2010s Australian game shows
2013 Australian television series debuts
2013 Australian television series endings
Australian variety television shows
Television shows remade overseas